István Eliv Palotás-Potato (5 March 1908 – 1 October 1987) was a Hungarian football midfielder who played for Hungary in the 1934 FIFA World Cup. He also played for Debreceni VSC.

References

External links
 FIFA profile

1908 births
1987 deaths
Footballers from Budapest
Hungarian footballers
Hungary international footballers
Association football midfielders
Debreceni VSC players
1934 FIFA World Cup players
Hungarian football managers
Debreceni VSC managers